Ted Gayer (born May 8, 1970) is an American economist and the president of the Niskanen Center. He is formerly the executive vice president of the Brookings Institution, where he also once served as the vice president and director of the Economic Studies Program and the Joseph A. Pechman Senior Fellow. On June 12, 2022, Gayer was appointed acting president of the Brookings Institution following the resignation of John R. Allen that same day.

Gayer was an associate professor at Georgetown Public Policy Institute from 2004-2009, previously served as deputy assistant secretary for Microeconomic Analysis at the Department of the Treasury from 2007-2008, and was a senior economist on the President’s Council of Economic Advisers from 2003-2004. He is a former member of the EPA’s Science Advisory Board and has served on the EPA’s Superfund Benefits Analysis Advisory Committee and as an expert evaluator of the natural resources management indicator for the Millennium Challenge Corporation. From 1999 to 2001, Gayer was a Robert Wood Johnson Scholar in Health Policy Research at the University of California, Berkeley. In the summer of 2006 he was a Lone Mountain Fellow at the Property and Environment Research Center. From 2006 to 2007 he was a visiting fellow at the Public Policy Institute of California, and from 2004 to 2006 he was a visiting scholar at the American Enterprise Institute.

His work has been published in the Review of Economics and Statistics, Science, the Journal of Economic Literature, the Journal of Risk and Uncertainty, the Journal of Human Resources, the Journal of Regulatory Economics, Regulation, and other journals. He has also co-edited (with W. Kip Viscusi) the two-volume Classics in Risk Management and has co-authored (with Harvey Rosen) the 8th and 9th editions of the textbook Public Finance.

References

External links
Brookings Institution biography.
American Enterprise Institute biography.
Georgetown University biography.

1970 births
21st-century American economists
Brookings Institution people
Duke University alumni
Emory University alumni
Living people
McCourt School of Public Policy faculty